Andrew Bloom (born August 11, 1973) is an American former Olympic shot putter, two-time national indoor shot put champion, World University Games shot put champion, and NCAA champion in both discus and shot put.

Early and personal life
Bloom is Jewish, and was born in Stamford, Connecticut.  He later lived in Niskayuna, New York, where he attended Niskayuna High School, graduating in 1991.  While there, he set a New York State high school discus throw record in 1991, with a distance of 202 feet, 9 inches.

He earned a master's degree in mathematics education from Wake Forest University in 1998.  He is married, and lives in Vacaville, California. He currently teaches mathematics at Ohlone College in Fremont, CA.

Shot put and discus career
Bloom attended Wake Forest University as an undergraduate, graduating in 1996.  At Wake Forest, he earned All-Atlantic Coast Conference honors each year.  As a senior, he won both the NCAA shot put (65–0.5; personal record) and discus (211–1) championships.  He became the eighth male in NCAA history to win that double.

Bloom won a silver medal in the discus at the 1997 World University Games, and was ranked third in the US in the discus in 1997.  In 1998, he won a silver medal in discus (209–10) at the 1998 Goodwill Games, and was third in shot put (66–11.25 PR) at the USA Indoors and third in discus (217–11 PR) at the USA Outdoors.

In 1999, he won a gold medal in the shot and a silver medal in discus at the 1999 World University Games. He was also fourth in shot put at the World Outdoor Championships in 1999 (20.95 m). He won the shot put at the USA Indoor Championships in 1999 and 2000, with a personal record throw of 70–10.5 in the latter.  He was ranked fifth in the world in both shot put and discus in 1999, and third in the US in shot put and second in discus.

Bloom made the US Olympic team in 2000, with a throw of 70–10.75.  He placed fourth at the Sydney 2000 Olympic Games, with a throw of 68–5.75 (20.87 m). He finished 2000 ranked second in the world, and with a season-best mark of 71–7.25.

He was honored by the US Jewish Sports Hall of Fame in 2001.

Coaching career
He serves as Assistant Coach at the University of California at Davis.  He is also the strength and conditioning coach for the UC Davis athletics program.

References

External links
USATF bio

1973 births
Living people
American male shot putters
American male discus throwers
Athletes (track and field) at the 2000 Summer Olympics
Goodwill Games medalists in athletics
Olympic track and field athletes of the United States
People from Niskayuna, New York
UC Davis Aggies track and field coaches
Universiade medalists in athletics (track and field)
Wake Forest Demon Deacons men's track and field athletes
People from Vacaville, California
Sportspeople from Schenectady, New York
Sportspeople from Stamford, Connecticut
Track and field athletes from Connecticut
Track and field athletes from New York (state)
Jewish male athletes (track and field)
Jewish American sportspeople
Universiade gold medalists for the United States
Universiade silver medalists for the United States
Medalists at the 1997 Summer Universiade
Medalists at the 1999 Summer Universiade
Competitors at the 1998 Goodwill Games
21st-century American Jews
People from Stamford, Connecticut